BTK may refer to:

Biology
 Bacillus thuringiensis kurstaki, a soil-dwelling bacterium
 Bruton's tyrosine kinase, a protein

Medicine

 BTK (below-the-knee amputation), amputation of the lower limb between the knee joint and the ankle joint

Business
 Bulgarian Telecommunications Company, (БТК in Cyrillic)
 Information and Communication Technologies Authority in Turkey, (abbreviated as BTK in Turkish)
 ICAO airline code for Batik Air
 IATA airport code for Bratsk Airport, Russia

Music
 Birth Through Knowledge, a Canadian hip-hop/rock band
 "Bind Torture Kill", a song by the band Suffocation on its self-titled album
 Bind, Torture, Kill, an album by the band Suicide Commando 
 "B.T.K", a song by Church of Misery
 "BTK", a song by Exodus

Transportation
 Baku-Tbilisi-Kars Railway
 Kaiser-Fleetwings XBTK, a US Navy dive and torpedo bomber

Other uses
 BTK, the ISO 639-2 and ISO 639-5 codes for Batak languages 
 Dennis Rader (born 1945), American serial killer known as "BTK"
 Pillars of Truth (Boutokaan Te Koaua), a political party in Kiribati

See also
 Born to Kill (disambiguation)